Pacific Myth is a subscription-based serial album and the fifth major release by the Canadian progressive metal band Protest the Hero, distributed through the online music subscription service Bandcamp. Following the independent release of their crowdfunded 2013 album Volition, the band sought to explore alternative release methods and decided upon a subscription-like platform wherein subscribers could get access to the scheduled arrival of a new song every month. Each of the songs, including artwork, lyrics, liner notes, instrumental versions, and high-quality downloads, were released through Bandcamp each month starting on October 15, 2015 with the first track, "Ragged Tooth," and ending on March 15, 2016 with the final track, "Caravan." The six songs effectively make up the band's fifth EP, and 11th overall release, released to the public on November 18, 2016. It is the band's first release with session member Cam McLellan on bass and full-time member Mike Ieradi on drums.

Track listing

Personnel

Band members
Rody Walker — vocals
Tim Millar — guitar, piano
Luke Hoskin —  guitar
Mike Ieradi — drums
Cam McLellan — bass

Other personnel
Michael Ciccia (of Mandroid Echostar) — guest vocals on "Cataract"
Milen Petzelt-Sorace — strings on "Caravan"
Cameron McLellan — engineering and production
Dean Hadjichristou — percussion engineering
Anthony Calabretta — mixing and mastering
John Meloche — layout and direction
Graham Curran — artwork for "Ragged Tooth," "Tidal," "Harbinger"
Jeff Jordan — artwork for "Cold Water," "Cataract," "Caravan"

Charts

References

Protest the Hero albums
2015 albums
2016 albums
Concept albums